Love Changes is the fourth studio album by American singer Kashif. It was released by Arista Records in 1987. The album was digitally remastered in 2012 by Funky Town Grooves and included six bonus tracks.

Background
The album includes the hit singles "Love Changes" with Meli'sa Morgan, "Love Me All Over", and "Loving You Only". Vocal trio Exposé provided most backing vocals; the track "Fifty Ways (To Fall in Love)" featured background vocals performed by Whitney Houston. The song "Love Changes" was originally sung by R&B group Mother's Finest in 1978, and covered again in 2005 by R&B artist Jamie Foxx, and hip hop artist Mary J. Blige.

Critical reception

Ron Wynn wrote in his retrospective review for AllMusic: "Kashif went the duet route on this late '80s release, working with both Dionne Warwick and Meli'sa Morgan and doing relatively well both times [...] The album was otherwise as slick and overproduced as ever, and his singing went back to the subdued patterns of earlier works."

Track listing
All tracks produced by Kashif; except "Who's Getting Serious?," produced by Lewis Martineé and Kashif.

Personnel 
 Kashif – lead vocals (1-4, 6-10), backing vocals (1, 2, 4, 7, 8, 9), keyboards (1-7, 9, 10), Synclavier (2, 3), percussion (2, 3, 6, 9, 10), rhythm arrangements (2, 4, 7, 9), synthesizers (4, 7, 9), programming (4), bass (4, 6, 10), drums (4, 6, 9, 10), all vocals (5)
 Larry Williams – programming (1), synthesizer programming (9)
 Eric Rehl – keyboards (2), bass (2), drums (2), rhythm arrangements (2)
 Darroll Gustamachio – Synclavier vocal programming (2)
 Robbie Buchanan – keyboards (3, 5), synthesizers (4), programming (4)
 Greg Phillinganes – acoustic piano (4), Rhodes piano (4), synthesizers (4, 9), backing vocals (4), keyboards (9)
 Mike Bakst – keyboards (8), percussion programming (8)
 Lewis Martineé – keyboards (8), percussion programming (8)
 Ira Siegel – guitars (2, 6, 7, 10)
 Dann Huff – guitars (3, 4, 9)
 Nestor Gomez – guitars (8)
 Wayne Braithwaite – bass (1)
 Nathan East – bass (3, 9)
 Paul Leim – drums (1, 3, 4, 5, 8), percussion (5)
 Bashiri Johnson – percussion (2, 9)
 Kenny G – soprano sax solo (5), alto saxophone (7)
 Vincent Henry – saxophone (6)
 Gene Page – horn and string arrangements (3, 4, 7, 9), conductor (3, 4, 7, 9)
 Meli'sa Morgan – lead and backing vocals (1)
 Yogi Lee – additional backing vocals (1, 2), backing vocals (3, 4, 9, 10)
 Audrey Wheeler – additional backing vocals (1), backing vocals (4)
 Brenda White – additional backing vocals (1), backing vocals (4)
 Doug E. Fresh – rap (2), vocal percussion (2)
 Johnny Kemp – backing vocals (3)
 Fonzi Thornton – backing vocals (4, 10), additional backing vocals (8)
 Whitney Houston – backing vocals (6)
 Cliff Dawson – backing vocals (7), rhythm arrangements (7)
 Exposé – backing vocals (8)
 Debra Byrd – additional backing vocals (8)
 Michelle Cobbs – additional backing vocals (8), backing vocals (10)
 Dionne Warwick – lead and backing vocals (9)
 Philip Ballou – backing vocals (10)
 Suzanne Slaughter – backing vocals (10)

Technical and Design
 Darroll Gustamachio – engineer (1-7, 9), mixing (1-7, 9, 10), additional engineer (8)
 Michael O'Reilly – engineer (1), mixing (1, 3, 8, 10)
 Lewis Martineé – engineer (8)
 Mike Couzzi – engineer (8)
 Kurt Upper – engineer (10)
 Dennis Mitchell – additional engineer (1), engineer (10)
 Russ Terrana – additional engineer (3, 4, 5, 7, 9)
 John Guess – additional engineer (8)
 Calvin Harris – additional engineer (9)
 Alan Gregorie – assistant engineer (1)
 Bob Loftus – assistant engineer (1, 9)
 Steve MacMillan – assistant engineer (1, 9)
 Craig Vogel – assistant engineer (2)
 Roger Talkov – assistant engineer (2)
 Michael Dotson – assistant engineer (3, 4, 7)
 Michael C. Ross – assistant engineer (3, 4)
 Larry Smith – assistant engineer (4, 9)
 Karen Siegel – assistant engineer (8)
 John Dranchak – assistant engineer (9)
 Steve James – assistant engineer (9)
 Adrian Salley – production coordinator 
 Russell Sidelsky – production coordinator 
 Mark Larson – art direction 
 Ann Petter – design 
 Matthew Rolston – photography

Charts

References

External links
 
 Love Changes at Discogs

1987 albums
Kashif (musician) albums